Devotion is a 1929 Austrian-German silent drama film directed by Guido Brignone and starring Marcella Albani, Hans Melzer, and Hans Adalbert Schlettow.

The film's sets were designed by Artur Berger and Emil Stepanek.

Cast

References

Bibliography

External links

1929 drama films
1929 films
Austrian silent feature films
Austrian drama films
German drama films
Films of the Weimar Republic
German silent feature films
Films directed by Guido Brignone
German black-and-white films
Austrian black-and-white films
Silent drama films
1920s German films
1920s German-language films